Upland, West Virginia may refer to:
Upland, Mason County, West Virginia, an unincorporated community in Mason County
Upland, McDowell County, West Virginia, an unincorporated community in McDowell County